The Koch'am T'an'gwang Line, or Koch'am Colliery Line, is an electrified  long freight-only railway line of the Korean State Railway in North Hamgyŏng Province, North Korea, from Myŏngch'ŏn on the P'yŏngra Line to Sinmyŏngch'ŏn and the Myŏngch'ŏn Coal Complex.

History
The line was originally opened around 1937 by the Chosen Government Railway.

Route
A yellow background in the "Distance" box indicates that section of the line is not electrified.

References

Railway lines in North Korea
Standard gauge railways in North Korea